Sevilla La Nueva or New Seville was the first permanent European settlement in Jamaica, the first capital of Jamaica and the third capital established by Spain in the Americas.  It was founded in 1509 by Juan de Esquivel who arrived with 80 citizens and their families.  

In 1518, due to health concerns arising from Sevilla la Nueva's proximity to a mangrove swamp, the settlement was moved to higher ground at a location which was only a short distance away from the first site.  This settlement was known simply as Sevilla. In 1534 the town's population was largely relocated again, this time to Spanish Town (Villa de la Vega) on the south side of Jamaica. A few inhabitants appear to have remained until 1554 when they were killed after French corsairs attacked the settlement.

Notes

External links
Britannica - Sevilla la Nueva

Populated places in Jamaica
Populated places established in 1509
Former populated places in the Caribbean